Dimitrios (or Demetrius) P. Golemis (15 November 1874– 9 January 1941) was a Greek athlete.  He competed at the 1896 Summer Olympics in Athens.

Biography
Golemis competed in the 800 metres.  He finished second in his preliminary heat to advance to the final.  There, he came in last of the three finalists who started the race, as Albin Lermusiaux of France withdrew from the final after defeating Golemis in the heats.  Golemis's third-place finish earned him a bronze medal (assigned retroactively by the International Olympic Committee, as no award was given for third place at the time).

He also competed in the 1,500 metres.  He finished in the bottom half of the eight runners who took part in the single race of the event, though his exact position is unclear.

References

External links

1874 births
1941 deaths
Athletes (track and field) at the 1896 Summer Olympics
19th-century sportsmen
Greek male middle-distance runners
Olympic athletes of Greece
Olympic bronze medalists for Greece
People from Lefkada
Medalists at the 1896 Summer Olympics
Olympic bronze medalists in athletics (track and field)
Place of death missing
Sportspeople from the Ionian Islands (region)